The following is a list of Central Connecticut Blue Devils men's basketball head coaches. There have been 10 head coaches of the Blue Devils in their 87-season history.

Central Connecticut's current head coach is Patrick Sellers. He was hired as the Blue Devils' head coach in May 2021, replacing Donyell Marshall, who stepped down as head coach after the 2020–21 season.

References

Central Connecticut

Central Connecticut Blue Devils men's basketball coaches